RFA Spabeck (A227) was one of six  coastal water carriers built for the Royal Fleet Auxiliary during the Second World War. During the 1950s she was modified to store high-test peroxide (HTP) for the experimental programme evaluating the feasibility of submarines using HTP operationally. The ship was sold for scrap in 1966.

Description
The Spa-class ships were designed for harbour duties as water carriers. displaced  at normal load and  fully loaded. They were powered by a three-cylinder vertical triple-expansion steam engine that drove a single propeller shaft, using steam provided by one cylindrical boiler. The ships were armed with a single 12-pounder gun and two  Oerlikon AA guns

Construction and career
Spabeck ordered in September 1941 from Philip and Son and was laid down on 14 May 1943 at their Dartmouth, Devon shipyard as Rivulet. The ship was launched on 21 June and commissioned on 3 September as Spabeck. She was modified in 1948 as a HTP tanker to support the experimental submarines , Explorer and Excalibur.

After the end of the programme in the early 1960s, Spabeck was laid up at Devonport. She was listed for disposal in January 1966 and put up for sale on 11 March. Purchased by a Belgian shipbreaking company for £10,875, she arrived at Antwerp en route to Willebroek, Belgium, for scrapping on 14 May.

References

Bibliography

 

 

Spa-class coastal water carriers
1943 ships